Xu Shaoshi (born October 1951) is a Chinese politician, and former Chairman of the National Development and Reform Commission of the People's Republic of China.

Xu was born in Ningbo, Zhejiang Province. He joined the Chinese Communist Party (CCP) in December 1974.

From April 2007 to March 2013, he was Minister of Land and Resources and the party chief of the Ministry. He is also the general supervisor of national land.

According to The Age in January 2010 Xu Shaoshi lead a high-level delegation to the Antarctic, aboard China's icebreaking research vessel, Xue Long.
Xu toured Australia's Casey Station before proceeding to China's Antarctic Zhongshan Station.
Among the officials who accompanied him was Qu Tanzhou, the director of the Chinese Arctic and Antarctic Administration.
Jo Chandler, writing in The Age, reported that Xu declined to be interviewed and the presence of his delegation was not covered in the Chinese Press.
Chandler reported that the purpose of the tour was to familiarize Xu and his colleagues with China's research efforts in the Antarctic, and the potential mineral resources that could be exploited there.  She noted that China, like all other parties to the International treaties to the Antarctic, was barred from resource exploitation until 2048.

He was a member of the 17th Central Committee of the Chinese Communist Party and is now a member of the 18th Central Committee.

At the first plenary session of the 12th National People's Congress in March 2013, Xu Shaoshi was elected as Chairman of the National Development and Reform Commission, succeeding Zhang Ping.

References

External links
Xu Shaoshi's profile at xinhuanet.com

Living people
Politicians from Ningbo
1951 births
Ministers of Land and Resources of China
Chinese Communist Party politicians from Zhejiang
People's Republic of China politicians from Zhejiang
Recipients of Hilal-i-Pakistan